Frederick Clare Moyer (November 6, 1887 – May 21, 1951) was a politician from Alberta, Canada. He served 5 years as an Independent member of the Legislative Assembly of Alberta.

Moyer was elected in the 1930 Alberta general election defeating two other Independent Candidates and defeating Archibald Key running under the Labor banner on vote transfers in a hotly contested race.

In the 1935 Alberta general election Moyer was defeated and came in a distant second in a landslide by Herbert Ingrey from the Alberta Social Credit Party.

External links
Legislative Assembly of Alberta Members Listing
1930 Drumheller election results

References 

Independent Alberta MLAs
1887 births
1951 deaths